Terror Australis: Best Australian Horror (Sydney: Coronet, 1993) was Australia's first original mass-market horror anthology for adults. It was edited by Leigh Blackmore. (It is technically preceded by Bill Congreve's anthology Intimate Armageddons  (MirrorDanse Books, 1992), although that volume did not have mass market distribution). 

Terror Australis the anthology grew from the magazine Terror Australis and drew on the talents of horror writers centred on Sydney's Gargoyle Club Horror Writers and Artists' Society; however it also featured many of Australia's big-name sf and horror writers. Most contributions were original, but a few were reprints, mainly from the Australian small press. The quantity of internal artwork featured, designed to showcase horror work in art as well as fiction, made it something of an innovation amongst paperbacks of the time in Australia.

A companion volume of sf stories, Mortal Fire: Best Australian SF, edited by Terry Dowling and Van Ikin, was issued by Coronet the same year.

Robert Bloch, author of Psycho, called the volume "a landmark - a monument to the genre". Seven of the included stories have since been reprinted, some several times (see below). 

Leanne Frahm's story from the anthology won the Ditmar Award for Best Australian Short Fiction.

There was to have been a follow-up volume, but Hodder & Stoughton (Coronet) were bought out by UK publisher Headline to form Hodder Headline, and the new owners did not take up the option for a continuing series.

Contents
 Leanne Frahm, "Catalyst"
 Terry Dowling, "The Daemon Street Ghost-Trap". This story has been reprinted multiple times including in Datlow and Windling (eds) Year's Best Fantasy and Horror Vol 7 (1994), in Dowling's collection An Intimate Knowledge of the Night, in Ken Gelder (ed), The Oxford Book of Australian Ghost Stories (1997), and in Dowling's collections Basic Black: Tales of Appropriate Fear (Cemetery Dance, 1996) and Cemetery Dance Select: Terry Dowling (2015 e-book) 
 Paul Lindsey, "The Wolves Are Running"
 Sharon A. Hansen, "Chameleon"
 Eddie van Helden, "Mabuza's Plum". First published in EOD 7 (1992). 
 Dr John Hugoe-Matthews, "Hantu-Rimba"
 Louise M. Steer, "Losing Faith"
 Robert Hood, "Openings"
 Guy Boothby, "Remorseless Vengeance". First published in...
 Bryce J. Stevens, "A Gift from Gehenna"
 Kendall Hoffmann, "Johnny Twofeller"
 Steven Paulsen, "In the Light of the Lamp". This story is reprinted in Robert M. Price, ed, The Cthulhu Cycle: Thirteen Tentacles of Terror. (Chaosium, 1996)
 Chris G.C. Sequeira, "Feeling Empty"
 Ann C. Whitehead, "The Nicholas Vine"
 Geoff O'Callaghan, "The Keeper"
 Rick Kennett, "Out of the Storm". First published in Chills (Spring 1992) An audio production of this story can be heard at: 
 Sean Williams, "Twist of the Knife". First published in Esoteric Order Of Dagon Magazine #5, December 1991. Reprint in Tenebre, November 1999 (French translation).
 Sheila Hatherley, "The Hut"
 Leigh Blackmore, "The Hourglass"
 Michael Bryant, "A Dangerous Thing"
 Sue Isle, "Makeover"
 Dirk Strasser, "Dear Reader". This story is included in the author's collection Stories of the Sand (Satalyte Publishing, 2014)
 Eddie van Helden, "The Vivisector"
 Cherry Wilder, "Anzac Day". First published in Lisa Tuttle, ed Skin of the Soul: New Horror Stories by Women  Womens Press, 1990).
 Bill Congreve, "Red Ambrosia". This story is reprinted in the author's collection Epiphanies of Blood: Tales of Desperation and Thirst (MirrorDanse, 1998)
 Stephen Dedman, "Heir of the Wolf". This story has been twice reprinted - in 'Tales of the Unanticipated (Fall/Winter/Spring 1997/98) and in the author's collection Never Seen by Waking Eyes (Infrapress, 2005)
 Greg Egan, "Neighbourhood Watch". First published in Aphelion (Summer 1986/87) and in Karl Edward Wagner (ed). The Year's Best Horror Stories XVI (DAW Books, 1988). Available as digital download on Pseudopod (No. 340, June 2013, ed. Shawn Garrett). 
 Bill Fewer, "Denials"

Notes

References
Mike Ashley & William G. Contento. The Supernatural Index: A Listing of Fantasy, Supernatural, Occult, Weird and Horror Anthologies. Wesport, CT: Greenwood Press, 1995, p. 733
Paul Collins (ed). The MUP Encyclopedia of Australian Science Fiction and Fantasy. Melbourne, Vic: Melbourne University Press, 1998, p. 46 (under entry on 'Dark Fantasy').
Steven Paulsen. "The State of the Australian Horror Fiction Magazine". Bloodsongs'' 1 (1994) and online at: 

1993 anthologies
Australian anthologies
Horror anthologies